Haplogroup T1 may refer to:
 a primary subclade of Haplogroup T (mtDNA) or;
 Haplogroup T-L206 (Y-DNA), also known as T1 – a primary subclade of haplogroup T (M184).